SensMe is a proprietary music mood and tempo detection system created by Sony Corporation, and employed in numerous Sony branded products, including in some Walkman digital music players, the Media Go application, the PlayStation Portable, and Sony Ericsson and Sony Xperia handsets. It is named Omakase Channel (おまかせチャンネルを使う) in Japan.

The function also appears as 12 Tone Analysis released with the VAIO Music Box software, for compatible Vaio notebooks.

Method
SensMe works by using a twelve tone analysis of all the user's music individually, computing track information based on the mood and tempo of the tracks, and then outputting them for the user to play these automatically generated playlists. Initially (on Sony Ericsson devices) the software would use a dual axis map where all the analyzed tracks are plotted into, allowing the user to navigate to an area of the map to play a playlist or an individual track. In later devices including Walkman DAPs and the PSP, the analyzed tracks are categorised into 12 "channels" that is navigatable in a list, with names such as Lounge, Upbeat, Emotional, and others.

Compatible products
SensMe debuted on the Sony Ericsson W910i phone in 2007.

PlayStation Portable

SensMe was made available on the PlayStation Portable as of system software version 6.10. It can be downloaded via the XMB or by using a computer. The application features twelve channels by which music is categorized. These include Favorites, Newly Added, Dance, Extreme, Lounge, Emotional, Mellow, Upbeat, Relax, Energetic, Morning/Day/Night/Midnight, and Shuffle All.

Version history

Walkman players
The NWZ-S730/S630 was the first Walkman series with SensMe.

 A Series
 NWZ-A860
 NWZ-A10
 NW-A20
 NW-A30
 NW-A40
 NW-A50
 E Series
 NWZ-E450
 NWZ-E350
 NW-E050
 NWZ-E460
 NW-E060
 NWZ-E570/E470
 NWZ-E580
 NW-E080
 F Series
 NWZ-F800
 NWZ-F880
 S Series
 NWZ-S730/S630
 NWZ-S750
 NWZ-S760
 NW-S770
 NW-S780
 NW-S10
 WM1 Series
 NW-WM1
 Z Series
 NWZ-Z1000
 ZX Series
 NWZ-ZX1
 NW-ZX2
 NW-ZX100
 NW-ZX300

Sony Ericsson handsets

 Aino
 elm
 W380
 W508
 W518a
 W595
 W705
 W715
 W760
 W890i
 W902
 W910i
 W980
 W995
 Xperia X10
 Xperia Neo
 Xperia Play
 Xperia Ray
 Zylo (W20i)

Sony Xperia handsets

 Xperia E
 Xperia M
 Xperia Sola
 Xperia L
 Xperia S
 Xperia P
 Xperia U
 Xperia T
 Xperia TX
 Xperia TL
 Xperia T2 Ultra
 Xperia tipo
 Xperia Go
 Xperia V
 Xperia Z
 Xperia ZR
 Xperia Z1
 Xperia Z1 Compact
 Xperia Z Ultra
 Xperia Z1f/Z1s
 Xperia ZL
 Xperia SP
 Xperia Z2
 Xperia Z3
 Xperia Z3 Compact

Miscellaneous

 Media Go application
 Music Center for PC application (as 12 Tone Analysis)
 Sony HAP-Z1ES Audio HDD player
 Sony Xplod car audio and navigation systems (selected models)
 Sony Tablet (selected models)

References

Sony software
Music search engines